Ishtiaq Ahmed (born 24 February 1947) is a Swedish political scientist and author of Pakistani descent. He holds a PhD in Political Science from Stockholm University. He is Professor Emeritus of Political Science at Stockholm University.

References

1947 births
Living people
Stockholm University alumni
Swedish political scientists
Swedish male writers
Pakistani emigrants to Sweden
Writers from Lahore
Forman Christian College alumni
University of the Punjab alumni
Academic staff of Lahore University of Management Sciences
St. Anthony's High School, Lahore alumni